The Dark Pictures Anthology: The Devil in Me is a 2022 interactive drama and survival horror video game with slasher horror elements developed by Supermassive Games and published by Bandai Namco Entertainment. It is the fourth and final installment of season one in The Dark Pictures Anthology, after Man of Medan (2019), Little Hope (2020), and House of Ashes (2021).

Like earlier games in the series, The Devil in Me features a cast of five playable protagonists and a multilinear gameplay narrative influenced by player choice. The game's decision-making scenes, of which there are several, can significantly alter the trajectory of the plot and change the relationships between the main characters. Due to these choices, any of the five protagonists can die permanently. The title introduced new features, such as character inventory, tool-based puzzles, and new movement capabilities such as running, jumping, and climbing.

The Devil in Me was released for PlayStation 4, PlayStation 5, Windows, Xbox One, and Xbox Series X/S on 18 November 2022.

Gameplay 
The Devil in Me introduces multiple new gameplay features that are a departure from the previous entries in The Dark Pictures Anthology. There is now an inventory feature for the characters, tool-based puzzles, as well as new movement capabilities including running, jumping, and climbing.

Synopsis

Setting and prologue 

The Devil in Me plot begins in Chicago where H. H. Holmes runs the World's Fair Hotel, which is full of traps for his unsuspecting guests. Construction on the Hotel began in 1887 and was completed in 1892. After Holmes was caught, he confessed to his murders by saying "I was born with the devil in me" and that he couldn't help the fact that he murdered people as a result. The game follows the myth of Holmes, as his crimes and story were likely exaggerated. His victims also weren't strangers that he lured to him, but instead they were people he befriended or romanced. The "Murder Castle" wasn't truly a hotel, as the first two floors (of three total) consisted of shops and long term rentals.

The prologue takes place in the time of the 1893 Chicago World's Fair, where newlywed couple Jeff and Marie Whitman check into the World's Fair Hotel to celebrate their honeymoon. However, soon after the check in, both are murdered by the hotel's proprietor, Henry Howard Holmes.

Characters 

The game's five protagonists include Kate Wilder (Jessie Buckley), an investigative journalist and the host of the documentary film show Architects of Murder. Also in the ensemble is Charles Lonnit (Paul Kaye), the director of Architects of Murder and the founder of Lonnit Entertainment. Rounding out the film crew are Kate's ex-boyfriend, and cameraman Mark Nestor (Fehinti Balogun), chief grip Jamie Tiergan (Gloria Obianyo), and intern sound engineer, Erin Keenan (Nikki Patel).

Main plot 
The present day is set in October 2022 and focuses on the film crew Lonnit Entertainment, which consists of director Charlie Lonnit (Paul Kaye), reporter Kate Wilder (Jessie Buckley), cameraman Mark Nestor (Fehinti Balogun), lighting technician Jamie Tiergan (Gloria Obianyo), and intern Erin Keenan (Nikki Patel). They are in a desperate search for ideas to finish their first season of a series about famous murderers, the success of which has begun to wane. The crew plan for their season finale to cover Holmes, but they feel disappointed with their current progress. A mysterious benefactor, claiming to be a certain Granthem Du'Met (Abdul Salis), invites the crew to shoot at his estate, a perfect replica of the Murder Castle with several artifacts related to Holmes' series of murders. While the rest of the crew is cautious, Charlie readily agrees, convinced it will save their show.

They are taken to the estate, located on an island in Lake Michigan, via ferry. The crew takes notice of Du'Met's suspiciously hasty behavior; Jamie witnesses him and a little girl hurriedly leave on the ferry, effectively stranding them on the island, and Erin finds herself in a life-threatening situation when a mysterious figure traps her in a dusty room. Conflict arises between the crew—Charlie refuses to cancel their shooting, while Kate insists they leave the island for their safety. The same figure starts building animatronics that resemble the crew members as the crew set up their equipment and decides to begin shooting in Du'Met's absence. In a search for him, Charlie and Jamie stumble into a booby trap. They encounter a man dressed as Holmes, surmising that he was behind the trap, he is the real Du'Met, and the man from the call was an impostor.

Shortly after, the estate is locked shut. The crew is separated, forced to avoid Du'Met and survive his traps, such as a set of mannequins arranged to gouge someone's eyes, chambers that can be deprived of air or set ablaze by a mannequin, and a moving glass wall that can crush one of two people. Along the way, characters can uncover clues revealing that Du'Met's original identity was Hector Munday. Munday was an FBI agent tasked to profile a serial killer, Manny Sherman, who convinced him to become a serial killer himself. They can also discover that the impostor and the little girl was the true crime author Joseph Morello and his daughter. Morello, similarly fixated on Holmes, was part of the previous five-person group that became trapped in the estate.

The survivors decide the best way to survive the night is activating the island's lighthouse to signal for help. What happens next is determined by player choice. If Kate and Mark are the only survivors and are captured by Du'Met, he shows them a video of Morello explaining his modus operandi of baiting groups to the island and instructs Mark to pose as Du'Met and do the same, lest they die from their trap. Mark can comply and lure the next group to the island in exchange for their freedom, after which Du'Met betrays and shoots them, or refuse. Otherwise, a policeman arrives on the island to search for the survivors, only for Du'Met to promptly kill him. The survivors attempt to escape the island by boat, but Du'Met sneaks onboard for a final showdown. Any surviving crew members are rescued by a truck driver after swimming to shore, and the authorities begin investigating Lonnit Entertainment's disappearance.

Development and release

Gameplay and story 
The Devil in Me is the fourth game in a series of eight planned for The Dark Pictures Anthology. The game was released on 18 November 2022.

Reception 

The PC and PlayStation 5 versions of The Dark Pictures Anthology: The Devil in Me received "mixed or average" reviews on Metacritic, while the Xbox Series X version has received "generally favorable reviews".

Sequel 
The next game in the series was a spin-off titled The Dark Pictures: Switchback VR, which was announced in November 2022. The game is a fast-paced roller coaster action-horror shooter and a spiritual successor to Until Dawn: Rush of Blood. It features locations and elements from the four games comprising the first season of the anthology. Switchback VR was released on 16 March 2023 for PlayStation VR2.

The series' next main entry game is The Dark Pictures Anthology: Directive 8020, which will be the first game in The Dark Pictures second season. The first trailer was shown at the end of The Devil in Me. Directive 8020 will feature a science fiction theme and will be set in outer space. No release date or platforms have been announced.

Notes

References

External links 

 

2022 video games
Bandai Namco games
2020s horror video games
Interactive movie video games
Multiplayer and single-player video games
PlayStation 4 games
PlayStation 4 Pro enhanced games
PlayStation 5 games
Supermassive Games
Unreal Engine games
Video game sequels
Video games set in Chicago
Video games developed in the United Kingdom
Video games featuring black protagonists
Video games featuring female protagonists
Video games with alternate endings
Windows games
Xbox One games
Xbox One X enhanced games
Xbox Series X and Series S games